Lin Tucci (born Linda Petrucci, February 8, 1960) is an American actress. Tucci is known for her performance as Henrietta "Mama" Bazoom in the film Showgirls (1995). She also performed in the number of theater productions, and co-starred in several films.

Tucci became interested in acting while in High School in Rhode Island. She later attended Community College of Rhode Island and Boston Conservatory of Music, where she received a fine arts degree in theater. Afterwards, Tucci moved to New York to pursue a career in acting.

In 2013, Tucci began appearing in a recurring role in the Netflix comedy-drama series, Orange Is the New Black. She plays the role of Anita DeMarco, an outspoken Jersey-Italian inmate.

Filmography

References

External links

Living people
American film actresses
American stage actresses
American television actresses
Actresses from Massachusetts
20th-century American actresses
21st-century American actresses
1960 births